Khartaphu (also Kardapu) is a mountain in the Himalayas of Asia at the head of the Kharta valley.

Khartaphu was first climbed by the 1935 British Mount Everest reconnaissance expedition.

See also
List of mountains in China

References

Mountains of Tibet
Seven-thousanders of the Himalayas